Allen Schick is  a governance fellow of the Brookings Institution and also a professor of political science at the Maryland School of Public Policy of University of Maryland, College Park. He is known as an authority on budget theory and the federal budget process, in particular. His book, Congress and Money: Budgeting, Spending, and Taxing, won the D.B. Hardeman Prize in 1982.

Schick advises members of Congress and has conducted numerous studies on budget systems and policies; public management; and government finance.

He is the founding editor of the professional journal, Public Budgeting and Finance.

Publications

 Congress and Money: Spending, Taxing, and Budgeting, American Society for Public Administration, 1987
 Making Economic Policy in Congress, American Enterprise Institute, 1984
 The Capacity to Budget, 1990
 The Budget Puzzle, 1993
 The Federal Budget: Politics, Policy, Process, 1995
 Budget Innovation in the States, 1972

References

External links
 

Public administration scholars
Living people
American political scientists
University of Maryland, College Park faculty
Year of birth missing (living people)
Brookings Institution people